The Batau clan trace their origin from the Swazi. They moved north to Lake Chrissie area from Wakkerstroom. After the defeat by Mzilikazi during the Mfecane they settled in the area now known as Sekhukhuneland in Limpopo Province. Their totem animal is the lion. 

Batau people include Batau Ba Masemola, Batau ba Manganeng, Batau ba Marishane, Phaahla, Kgaphola (Nkambule), Mogashoa (Mkhatshwa), Nchabeleng, Maroteng, Mohlaletsi, Malatane, Byldrift and Mmotwaneng. These communities share the same history. They were all united under one political head, Kgoshi Ngwato, back in the 14th and 15th century. At this time they lived along the Crocodile River in Mpumalanga.But they have been consistent with their views. 

From there they migrated to the Transvaal, to the place currently called Pretoria. At this time they were under the political leadership of Matlebo. Eventually they migrated further north to Sekhukhune, where they were led by Matlebjane. According to record established by Mamagase Macheng Makgaleng and later considered by Chris Kanyane, King Matlebjane was the younger brother of Matlebo. So after Matlebo died, Matlebjane took power because Matlebo died without the heir to his Throne.

Matlebjane ruled Batau for a long time. The case was accepted by the Batau people.

Matlebjane had six sons: Mokwena, Seloane, Mogashoa (Who was the sister's son) Masemola, Phaahla and Photo, each by different wives. As Matlebjane grew old he preferred to spend his time with a young wife who was very beautiful. All the rewards and dibego were taken to the younger wife and all the kingly honours were enjoyed with the younger wife. Photo was the son of this younger wife. In time the other sons of Matlebjane, got worried that their father would give the kingship to Photo. So this became a sore affair. The issue was very unsettling also to the other wives. So out of this a bloody political plan was cooked. The three sons Seloane, Masemola, Phaahla including Mogashoa colluded and planned that Matlebjane their father and King of Batau must die. They wanted to kill him. But the question was how and how were they going to manage the political fall-out after the murder had happened. They knew there was going to be an uprising in the community and they will be killed. So the proposed a plan that Photo must be the one to kill Matlebjane.

Because Photo was still young teenager - his brothers found it easy to influence him badly and bring him into their bloody scheme of murdering Matlebjane. According to their plan they will visit Matlebjane in his sleep with spears to all kill him. But that was only half of the plan, the part that was communicated to Photo. The full plan was that all the sons excluding Photo will have their spears bent at the tip end. So as they entered the King's resting place at night and they signaled that all stab the King in his sleep it was Photo's spear that pierced through and killed the King. The other did not kill the Kings as their spears were bent at the tip end.

Nevertheless, the community suspected and finally discovered the whole full story. So the community of Batau was divided through each of the sons. And the Batau scattered. And now you have Batau ba Masemola separated from others under their own political leadership, you have Phaahla alone, Mogashoa alone, Kgaphola alone, Seloane alone and Photo covering the whole area of Tubatse further north. Other Batau travelled furth north and are now found in various communities across the vast Limpopo Province.

References 

Mamagase Macheng Makgaleng (1956): Batau ba Tsitlana, Van Schaik.

MM Makgaleng (1952) : Batau Ba Tsitlana
 Makgaleng taught at Kilnerton Institute (Pretoria) in the 1950s and 1960s

Chris Kanyane (2003) : History of Batau
 Chris Kanyane also wrote a Barack Obama biography book: Moving Forward based on his experiences in Kenya.

External links 
 History of Bapedi Nation

EM Ramaila (1937): Setlogo Sa Batau, A historian from Tisane Royal Kraal

See also 

Masemola traditional village community, Ga Masemola

Byldrift Malatane Ga Seloane traditional village communities

Sotho-Tswana peoples in South Africa
Limpopo